Gustave Juvet (born 25 September 1896, La Côte-aux-Fées, Neuchâtel –  2 April 1936, Valais) was a Swiss mathematician.

Biography
Juvet received his licence in mathematical sciences from the University of Neuchâtel in 1917 and then the same degree from the Sorbonne in 1919. He taught astronomy and geodesy from 1920 to 1928 at the University of Neuchâtel. In 1928 he became a professor at the University of Lausanne, where he retained his academic position until his unexpected death from a heart attack in 1936. In 1926 he received his doctorate from the Faculté des sciences de Paris.

He was an Invited Speaker at the ICM in 1928 in Bologna and in 1932 in Zürich. For the two years 1932 and 1933 he was the President of the Swiss Mathematical Society.

In adolescence, while attending Neuchâtel's gymnasium, he was a close friend of Jean Piaget (who became a famous psychologist) and Rolin Wavre (who became a prominent mathematician). Juvet married in 1925.

Selected publications

Articles

with  Ferdinand Gonseth:

Books

References

External links
Temps, Espace, Matière (translation of Weyl's Raum, Zeit, Materie by Gustave Juvet & Robert Leroy)

20th-century  Swiss  mathematicians
University of Neuchâtel alumni
Academic staff of the University of Neuchâtel
Academic staff of the University of Lausanne
People from Neuchâtel
1896 births
1936 deaths